Iris unguicularis (syn. Iris stylosa), the Algerian iris, is a rhizomatous flowering plant in the genus Iris, native to Greece, Turkey, Western Syria, and Tunisia. The flowers appear in winter and early spring.

This plant is widely cultivated in temperate regions, and numerous cultivars have been selected for garden use, including a slightly more tender white form 'Alba', and a dwarf variety I. unguicularis subsp. cretensis. The cultivar 'Mary Barnard' has gained the Royal Horticultural Society's Award of Garden Merit.

Chemistry 
In 2013, a chemical analysis study was carried on Iris loczyi and Iris unguicularis as both plants are known as medicinally important.
The rhizome of Iris unguicularis contains 1,3-O-diferuloylsucrose, 5,7-dihydroxy-6-methoxychromone, irilone, 4′,5,7-trihydroxy-6-methoxyflavanone, tectorigenin, kaempferol, 4′,5,7-trihydroxy-3′,8-dimethoxyflavanone, 8-methoxyeriodictyol, hispidulin and mangiferin.

References

unguicularis
Plants described in 1789
Flora of Lebanon